The Ehrlichiaceae are a family of bacteria, included in the order Rickettsiales.

References

External links
 

Rickettsiales
Bacteria families